= Friedrich Georg Hendel =

Austrian high school director and entomologist

Friedrich Georg Hendel (14 December 1874 in Vienna – 26 June 1936 in Baden bei Wien) was an Austrian high school director and entomologist mainly interested in Diptera. He described very many new species and made important contributions to the higher taxonomy of the Diptera.

His collection is in the Vienna Natural History Museum.

== Works ==
Selection 1908-1914

- 1908 Nouvelle classification des mouches à deux ailes (Diptera L.), d’après un plan tout nouveau par J. G. Meigen, Paris, an VIII (1800 v.s.). Mit einem Kommentar. Verh. Zool.-Bot. Ges.Wien 58: 43-69.
- 1910 Über die Nomenklatur der Acalyptratengattungen nach Th. Beckers Katalog der paläarktischen Dipteren, Bd. 4. Wien. Ent. Ztg. 29: 307-313.
- 1914 Diptera. Fam. Muscaridae, Subfam. Platystominae. Genera Ins. 157, 179 pp., 15 pls.
- 1914 Die Arten der Platystominen. Abh. Zool.-Bot. Ges. Wien 8 (1): 1-409, 4 pls.
- 1914 Die Bohrfliegen Südamerikas. Abh. Ber. K. Zool. Anthrop.-Ethn. Mus. Dresden (1912) 14 (3): 1-84, 4 pls..

Other works see the reference section in Sabrosky's Family Group Names in Diptera
